Falsohyllisia is a genus of beetles in the family Cerambycidae, containing the following species:

 Falsohyllisia debile Fahraeus, 1872
 Falsohyllisia kivuensis (Breuning, 1952)
 Falsohyllisia meridionale Hunt & Breuning, 1957

References

Agapanthiini